The Libertarian Party of Tennessee (LPTN) is a political party in the United States that operates in the state of Tennessee.  It is a recognized affiliate of the national Libertarian Party of the United States.  On September 20, 2010, the party gained the legal right to ballot access after a restrictive Tennessee law was struck down in the case Libertarian Party of Tennessee v. Goins. The party's annual convention is held in Murfreesboro, Tennessee.

Ballot access
In a joint lawsuit filed on January 23, 2008 by the Libertarian, Green and Constitution Parties of Tennessee against the State of Tennessee, a 1972 state law that limited state ballot access was challenged and overturned.  The law had required a petition with signatures amounting to 2.5% of the most recent gubernatorial votes be submitted to the State Board of Elections 120 days before the election in which parties wished to have their party listed on the state ballot.  Prior to the lawsuit, the LPTN had never applied for ballot access in Tennessee, though the Populist Party, the Reform Party, the Constitution Party and the Green Party had unsuccessfully applied.

In the September 20, 2010 ruling, U.S. District Court Judge William Joseph Haynes struck down the petition deadline, the precise wording of the petition requirements and the volume of signatures required.

Current leadership
Source:
 Dave Jones, Chair
 LeMichael Wilson, Vice Chair
 Kenna Porter, Secretary
 David Tyler, Treasurer

Elected officials
 Joshua Beal -- Montgomery County Commissioner
 Erika Ebel -- Smith County Commissioner
 Cole Ebel -- Carthage City Council
 Stephen Chambers -- Trousdale County Mayor

College Libertarian Chapters
College Libertarians of UT-Martin (University of Tennessee – Martin)

Notable Tennessee Libertarians
 Harry Browne
 Mary Phelps
 John McAfee

See also

 Libertarian Party of the United States
 List of state parties of the Libertarian Party (United States)
 Tennessee Republican Party
 Tennessee Democratic Party
 Political party strength in Tennessee
 Campaign for Liberty

References

External links
 Libertarian Party of Tennessee Website
 Libertarian Party of the United States Website
 LPTN Facebook Page
 LPTN Facebook Group Page
 Tennessee Campaign for Liberty
 Tennessee Liberty Alliance

Tennessee
Political parties in Tennessee